USS Madison may refer to the following ships of the United States Navy:

, was a 22-gun corvette launched in 1812 on Lake Ontario and served in the War of 1812
, was a Van Buren-class schooner built in 1832 for United States Revenue Service and was returned to the Treasury Department and later (1850) to the United States Coastal Survey.
, was a Benson-class destroyer launched 20 October 1939 and struck 1 June 1968

See also 

 

United States Navy ship names